The Commons at Calabasas is a retail and entertainment complex in Calabasas, California, United States, built, owned, and operated by Rick J. Caruso and his company Caruso Affiliated. It has now become a tourist destination as celebrities, such as Kim Kardashian, are frequently seen at the high-end shopping center.

History
Development of the upscale retail and entertainment complex began with a vision of an Umbrian village, complementing the community's dominant Mediterranean style. Caruso Affiliated did not just want to build a shopping center, but a town center for the city of Calabasas. The Commons at Calabasas opened in 1998 and has been a popular high-end outdoor mall ever since.

Design
The  outdoor marketplace is located in Calabasas in Los Angeles County, California. Caruso Affiliated claims the design resembles a hill town of the Umbria region in rural Italy, renovated to be a retail resort. Its 40 tenants provide everyday needs, lifestyle/specialty shops, and entertainment.

Information
The Commons at Calabasas is a crescent of high-end retail stores, restaurants and entertainment choices set against the hillsides of Calabasas, one of the wealthiest communities in California.  The Commons at Calabasas is the most dominant retail center in the region. With this upscale shopping center, a town center was created where none had existed before. The developer provided urban amenities that encourage shoppers and residents to make it a destination, thereby “seeding” the Park Centre area for further development as a commercial and civic center. The Commons at Calabasas has free parking lot and numerous outdoor dining areas.

Stores 
Stores in The Commons at Calabasas are:
 Barnes & Noble
 BCBC Nails
 Chico's
 Citibank
 Drybar
 Elyse Walker
 Feature
 Lululemon
 Paper Source
 Polacheck's Jewelers
 Ralphs
 Rite Aid
 Sephora
 Starbucks
 The Kingdom
 Williams Sonoma Home

Dining 
 Fresh Brothers
 Jeni's Splendid Ice Cream
 King's Fish House
 Marmalade Cafe
 Pick Up Stix
 Porta Via Italian Foods
 See's Candies
 Starbucks Coffee
 Sugarfish By Sushi Nozawa
 Sunlife Organics
 Toscanova

Services 
 Edwards Grand Palace Stadium 6
 Fazio Cleaners
 Wink Optometry

Gallery

References

External links
 The Commons at Calabasas

Calabasas, California
Shopping malls in the San Fernando Valley
Shopping malls established in 1998